Nathan Baxter may refer to:

Nathan D. Baxter (born 1948), American bishop
Nathan Baxter (footballer) (born 1998), English footballer